Interjet served the following destinations prior to its suspension in December 2020:

References 

Interjet
Interjet